Fallingbrook can refer to the following:

Fallingbrook, Ottawa, a neighbourhood in the community of Orléans, in the city of Ottawa
Fallingbrook Middle School in Mississauga, Ontario